Zdeněk Nedvěd (born March 3, 1975) is a Czech former professional ice hockey player who played 31 games in the National Hockey League.  He played for the Toronto Maple Leafs.

Career
Nedved never became a regular in the league. He was a fine puck handler with a good wrist shot but he was unable to fight through the close checking of the NHL with regularity.  Nedved was a teenage star with Poldi Kladno. His family sent him to North America to play junior and develop his game more completely. Nedved became a fine scorer with the OHL's Sudbury Wolves and was chosen 123rd overall by the Toronto Maple Leafs in 1993. He scored 97 goals his last two years of junior and represented the Czech Republic at the World Junior Championships in 1994 and 1995. During the 1994 tourney played in his homeland, Nedved was among the top scorers while wreaking havoc in the offensive zone with David Výborný.

Nedved played one game for Toronto late in 1994-95 then prepared for the upcoming training camp. He made the 1995-96 edition of the Leafs and scored a goal early in the season opener against the  Pittsburgh Penguins. Nedved's play tailed off over the next month and he was sent down to the St. John's Maple Leafs of the American Hockey League. Eventually his season was ruined by a serious shoulder injury suffered in a mishap during practice. The next year Nedved played 23 games for Toronto but was unable to perform consistently. Nedved played for St. John's then the IHL's Long Beach Ice Dogs before leaving North America in 1998.

He moved back to his homeland where he played for HC Sparta Praha in 1998-1999. He then moved to Finland's SM-liiga and spent 4 seasons with Lukko Rauma.  He then spent two seasons in the Deutsche Eishockey Liga in Germany with the Kassel Huskies and the Hannover Scorpions before returning to Finland with Kärpät ahead of the 2004–05 seasons. His stay in Finland was short however, and after only four games, Nedved moved to Norway to play the remainder of the season for the Stavanger Oilers.

Nedved then spent two seasons with Anyang Halla in Asia. He moved back to the Czech Extraliga at the age of 32 to play for HC Kladno in 2007. In 2010, he was playing in Slovakia for HKm Zvolen.

Personal life
Nedvěd is the son of long-time HC Kladno hockey player Zdeněk Nedvěd, who won four Czechoslovak First Ice Hockey League titles with the club in the 1970s. His brother, Roman Nedvěd, also played for Kladno between 1986 and 1991.

Career statistics

Regular season and playoffs

International

References

External links

1975 births
Living people
HL Anyang players
HC '05 Banská Bystrica players
Czech ice hockey right wingers
Hannover Scorpions players
Rytíři Kladno players
HPK players
Kassel Huskies players
Long Beach Ice Dogs (IHL) players
Lukko players
HC Merano players
Oulun Kärpät players
People from Kladno District
IHC Písek players
St. John's Maple Leafs players
HC Sparta Praha players
Stavanger Oilers players
Sudbury Wolves players
Toronto Maple Leafs draft picks
Toronto Maple Leafs players
HKM Zvolen players
Sportspeople from the Central Bohemian Region
Czechoslovak ice hockey right wingers
Czech expatriate ice hockey players in Canada
Czech expatriate ice hockey players in the United States
Czech expatriate ice hockey players in Finland
Czech expatriate ice hockey players in Germany
Czech expatriate ice hockey players in Slovakia
Czech expatriate sportspeople in South Korea
Czech expatriate sportspeople in Italy
Czech expatriate sportspeople in Norway
Expatriate ice hockey players in South Korea
Expatriate ice hockey players in Italy
Expatriate ice hockey players in Norway